Rtd Col. Fred Mwesigye is a Ugandan politician,Former legislator Nyabushozi county, and former member of the army. He is currently serving as the High Commissioner of Uganda to the United republic of Tanzania.  He was the Member of Parliament for Nyabushozi County, Kiruhura District for (office term 2016 -2021) and former commander of the UPDF. He was among the 27 liberators in the 1981 Ugandan Bush War.

Education background

Work experience

Committee membership

Parliamentary committee membership

Covid-19 
He was among the members of the parliament who returned the Covid-19 Ush 20 million.

Presidency 
He once said that when president Yoweri Museveni steps down as a president, term limits will be restored.

References

Living people
Ugandan politicians
1956 births
21st-century Ugandan politicians